The New Zealand Cross may refer to one of two medals, both issued by the government of New Zealand:

 New Zealand Cross (1869), first New Zealand Cross instituted in 1869 to recognise gallantry during the New Zealand Wars of 1860 to 1872 – provided recognition to members of the local volunteer forces who were not eligible for the Victoria Cross
 New Zealand Cross (1999), second New Zealand medal of similar design to the above and instituted in 1999 as the premier civilian award for bravery